TerraPower is an American nuclear reactor design and development engineering company headquartered in Bellevue, Washington. TerraPower is developing a class of nuclear fast reactors termed traveling wave reactors (TWR).

TWR places a small core of enriched fuel in the center of a much larger mass of non-fissile material, in this case depleted uranium. Neutrons from fission in the core "breeds" new fissile material in the surrounding mass, producing Plutonium-239. Over time, enough fuel is bred in the area surrounding the core that it can undergo fission, sending neutrons further into the mass and continuing the process while the original core expires. Over a period of decades, the reaction moves from the core of the reactor to the outside, thus "travelling wave".

In September 2015, TerraPower signed an agreement with state-owned China National Nuclear Corporation to build a prototype 600 MWe reactor unit at Xiapu in Fujian province, China, from 2018 to 2025. Commercial power plants, generating about 1150 MWe, were planned for the late 2020s. However, in January 2019 it was announced that the project had been abandoned due to technology transfer limitations placed by the Trump administration.

In October 2020, the company was chosen by the United States Department of Energy as a recipient of a matching grant totaling between $400 million and $4 billion over the ensuing 5 to 7 years to build a demonstration reactor using their "Natrium" design. Natrium uses liquid sodium as a coolant (reducing the cost using an ambient pressure primary loop). It then transfers that heat to molten salt, which can be stored in tanks and used to generate steam on demand, enabling the reactor to run continuously at constant power, while allowing dispatchable electricity generation.

History

TerraPower is partly funded by the US Department of Energy (DOE) and Los Alamos National Laboratory. One of TerraPower's primary investors is Bill Gates (via Cascade Investment). Others include Charles River Ventures and Khosla Ventures, which reportedly invested $35 million in 2010. TerraPower is led by chief executive officer Chris Levesque. In December 2011 India's Reliance Industries bought a minority stake through one of its subsidiaries and its Chairman Mukesh Ambani joined the board. Other TerraPower participants include scientists and engineers from Lawrence Livermore National Laboratory, the Fast Flux Test Facility, Microsoft, and various universities, as well as managers from Siemens, Areva NP, the ITER project, Ango Systems Corporation, and DOE.

SK Group agreed to invest $250 million in 2022. The round was co-led by SK Inc and SK Innovation and Gates. DOE gave TerraPower cost-share funding through the Advanced Reactor Demonstration Program (ARDP) to test, license and build an advanced reactor within seven years. Terrapower selected Kemmerer, Wyoming as the preferred site.The proposed reactor would yield 345 MWe with a molten salt energy storage system. The reactor can temporarily boost output to 500 MWe, enabling the plant to integrate with renewable resources.

Mission 
Company objectives include:
 Exploring significant improvements to nuclear power using 21st century technologies, state-of-the-art computational capabilities and expanded data.
 Evaluating the impact of new concepts on the fuel cycle, from mining to spent fuel disposal.
 Pursuing independent private funding.

Designs

Traveling wave reactor 

TerraPower chose traveling wave reactors (TWRs) as its primary technology. Their major benefit is high fuel utilization that does not require nuclear reprocessing and could eliminate the need to enrich uranium. TWRs are designed to convert typically non-fissile fertile nuclides (U-238) into fissile nuclides (Pu-239) in-situ and then shift power production from the "burned" region to the "bred" region. This allows the benefits of a closed fuel cycle without the expense and proliferation-risk of enrichment/reprocessing plants. Enough fuel for between 40 and 60 years of operation could be included in the reactor during manufacturing. The reactor could be installed below ground, where it could operate for an estimated 100 years. TerraPower described its reactor design as a Generation IV design.

Environmental effects 

By using depleted uranium as fuel, the new reactor type could reduce enriched uranium stockpiles. TerraPower notes that the US harbors 700,000 metric tons of depleted uranium and that 320 metric tons could power 100 million homes for a year. Reports claim that TWR's high fuel efficiency, combined with the ability to use uranium recovered from river or sea water, means enough fuel is available to generate electricity for 10 billion people at US per capita consumption levels over million-year time-scales.

Research and development 

The TWR design is still in research and development. The conceptual framework was simulated by supercomputers with empirical evidence for theoretical feasibility. US regulators postponed the construction of an experimental reactor for a decade via certification process. On November 6, 2009, TerraPower executives and Bill Gates visited Toshiba's Yokohama and Keihin Factories in Japan, and concluded a non-disclosure agreement with them on December 1. Toshiba had developed an ultracompact reactor, the 4S, that could operate for 30 years without fuel handling and generated 10 megawatts. Some of the 4S technologies are considered to be transferable to TWRs.

Molten salt reactor 

In October 2015 the company was reported to be investigating a molten salt reactor design with Southern Company as a technology alternative. In February 2022, it was announced that the two companies had agreed to build a demonstration fast-spectrum salt reactor at Idaho National Laboratory (INL).

Sodium fast reactor (Natrium)  

Natrium combines a molten sodium reactor with a 1 GWh molten salt energy storage system. Sodium offers a 785-Kelvin temperature range between its solid and gaseous states, nearly 8x that of water's 100-Kelvin range. Without requiring costly and risky pressurization, sodium can absorb large amounts of heat. It is not at risk of decomposition at high temperature as water does. Sodium is non-corrosive. Natrium is fueled by high-assay, low enriched uranium (HALEU) as its fuel. HALEU is enriched to contain between 5 and 20 percent uranium, which can be produced from spent fuel. Plant sites are expected to be smaller and 4x more efficient than conventional plants. Natrium control rods descend using only gravity in case of equipment damage/failure. Power output is a constant 345 MWe. The plant is designed to run at 100 percent output, 24/7. The storage system is designed to work in tandem with intermittent energy sources, responding to their spikes and crashes. It can produce 150% of the rated power output, or 500 MWe for 5.5 hours.

In June 2021, TerraPower and PacifiCorp (of Warren Buffett) announced plans to build a joint Natrium reactor. Four cities in Wyoming affected by closure of fossil-fuel power plants were under consideration for the demonstration reactor: Gillette, Kemmerer, Glenrock and Rock Springs, Wyoming. PacificCorp does business in Wyoming as Rocky Mountain Power and has a coal power plant in each of the candidate locations. It was announced November 16, 2021 that Kemmerer had been selected. The commercial power plant could be operational by 2030.

See also 

 Fast breeder reactor
 Small modular reactor

References

External links 

 

Bill Gates
Manufacturing companies established in 2006
Nuclear power reactor types
Nuclear power companies of the United States
Nuclear technology companies of the United States
Companies based in Bellevue, Washington
American companies established in 2006